Long Điền is a township (Thị trấn) and town and capital of Long Điền District, Bà Rịa–Vũng Tàu province, in Vietnam.

It is located along National Route 55. It is home to the Long Ban pogoda, which was built in the 17th century.

Populated places in Bà Rịa-Vũng Tàu province
Communes of Bà Rịa-Vũng Tàu province
District capitals in Vietnam
Townships in Vietnam